Usher is an enterprise security platform released by Microstrategy, Inc. in 2015. The technology is designed to replace user-entered passwords with biometric identity and multi-step authentication methods, and features digital badges and geo-fencing administration options. The service takes the form of a mobile application that allows users to access both physical and digital space based on more passive identification methods (facial recognition, Bluetooth discovery, etc).

Overview
Usher has been positioned as a "password killer" that is based on moving towards security credentials more tied to identity and place. Applications that can be managed via Usher include Salesforce.com, Google Apps, and select Microsoft software.

The security features of the product are backed up by Usher Analytics, which allows administrators to assess data in real time to identify threats and behavioral abnormalities.

Clients
Organizations that use Usher include: 
Georgetown University
1776
Saudi Arabia Ministry of Foreign Affairs
Blackbox BI Consultancy

References

External links
 

Computer security software
Password authentication